Balkrishna Mabuhang (also spelled Bal Krishna Mabuhang) is an associate professor at Tribuwan University, Nepal. He occasionally advocates about the current issues of the indigenous peoples of Nepal, and is an advisor to the Nepal Federation of Indigenous Nationalities.

References

External links

Academic staff of Tribhuvan University
Living people
Tribhuvan University alumni
Indigenous rights activists
Nepalese activists
Year of birth missing (living people)